A leaf miner is any one of numerous species of insects in which the larval stage lives in, and eats, the leaf tissue of plants. The vast majority of leaf-mining insects are moths (Lepidoptera), sawflies (Symphyta, the mother clade of wasps), and flies (Diptera). Some beetles also exhibit this behavior.

Like woodboring beetles, leaf miners are protected from many predators and plant defenses by feeding within the tissues of the leaves, selectively eating only the layers that have the least amount of cellulose. When attacking Quercus robur (English oak), they also selectively feed on tissues containing lower levels of tannin, a deterrent chemical produced in great abundance by the tree.

The pattern of the feeding tunnel and the layer of the leaf being mined is often diagnostic of the insect responsible, sometimes even to species level. The mine often contains frass, or droppings, and the pattern of frass deposition, mine shape, and host plant identity are useful to determine the species and instar of the leaf miner. Some mining insects feed in other parts of a plant, such as the surface of a fruit or the petal of a flower.

It has been suggested that some patterns of leaf variegation may be part of a defensive strategy employed by plants to deceive adult leaf miners into thinking that a leaf has already been preyed upon.

Leaf-mining species 
One common leaf-mining species in New Zealand is Scaptomyza flava. The species is particularly problematic for plants in the family Brassiceae, more commonly known as mustard plants.

Relationship with humans

Leaf miners are regarded as pests by many farmers and gardeners as they can cause damage to agricultural crops and garden plants, and can be difficult to control with insecticide sprays as they are protected inside the plant's leaves. Spraying the infected plants with spinosad, an organic insecticide, can control some leaf miners. Spinosad does not kill on contact and must be ingested by the leaf miner. Two or three applications may be required in a season. However, this will have harmful ecological effects, especially if sprayed when bees or other beneficial arthropods are present.

Leaf miner infection of crops can be reduced or prevented by planting trap crops near the plants to be protected. For example, lambsquarter and columbine will distract leaf miners, drawing them to those plants and therefore reducing the incidence of attack on nearby crops. This is a method of companion planting.

See also
Agromyzidae (leaf miner flies)
Pegomya hyoscyami (spinach/beet leaf miner)
Douglasiidae (including Tinagma, the largest genus of Douglasiidae)
Gracillariidae
Liriomyza sativae (vegetable leaf miner)
Liriomyza trifolii (American serpentine leaf miner)
Nepticulidae
Horse-chestnut leaf miner (Cameraria ohridella)
Tenthredinidae (some species)
Tischerioidea (trumpet leaf-miner moths)
Folivore

References

External links

British leafminers - many of which are distributed widely across Europe.
The leaf and stem mines of British flies and other insects. Includes illustrated keys for identification of mines by host-plant genus and detailed descriptions of over 900 species along with their distribution in Great Britain and Northern Ireland and elsewhere.
Leafminers of Europe - covers over 1800 leafmining insect species.
Leafminers of southeastern U.S. woody ornamentals on the UF / IFAS Featured Creatures Web site
Liriomyza trifolii, American serpentine leafminer
Liriomyza sativae, vegetable leafminer
Phyllocnistis citrella, citrus leafminer
CISR: Citrus Leaf Miner Center for Invasive Species Research page on Citrus Leaf Miner

Agricultural pest insects
Folivores
Leaf miners